Bala Kala Gavabar (also Romanized as Bālā Kalā Gavābar; also known as Kalākāvar-e Bālā) is a village in Malfejan Rural District, in the Central District of Siahkal County, Gilan Province, Iran. At the 2006 census, its population was 75, in 18 families.

References 

Populated places in Siahkal County